Camouflage is the tenth studio album by funk band Rufus (and their sixth album featuring Chaka Khan), released on the MCA Records label in 1981. Camouflage peaked at #15 on Billboards R&B Albums chart and stalled at #98 on Pop. The album includes the singles "Sharing the Love" (US R&B 8, US Pop #91) and "Better Together" (US R&B #66, US Dance #56).

Following the release of Camouflage, Chaka Khan recorded her third, fourth and fifth solo albums What Cha' Gonna Do for Me (1981), Echoes of an Era (1982) and Chaka Khan (1982) and Rufus recorded their third album without Khan, Seal in Red (1983), before they reunited for one final album together later in 1983, the double live/studio set Stompin' at the Savoy – Live.

Track listing

Personnel
 Chaka Khan - vocals
 Tony Maiden - guitar, vocals
 Kevin Murphy - keyboards
 Bobby Watson - bass guitar
 David "Hawk" Wolinski - synthesizer, keyboards
 John Robinson - percussion, drums
 Angela Winbush - keyboards, background vocals
 René Moore - background vocals
 Lalomie Washburn - background vocals 
 Vince Charles - steel drums 
 Paulinho Da Costa - percussion 
 Greg Phillinganes - keyboards
 Larry Williams - saxophone

Production
 Rufus - record producers 
 John VanNest - audio engineer

ChartsAlbumSingles'''

References

External linksCamouflage'' at Discogs

1981 albums
Rufus (band) albums
Chaka Khan albums
MCA Records albums